Madhuranombarakattu is a 2000 Indian Malayalam-language drama film directed by Kamal and written by Raghunath Paleri, starring Biju Menon and Samyuktha Varma. The music was composed by Vidyasagar. The film won the Kerala State Film Award for Second Best Film.

Plot
Vishnu is a govt school teacher who is travelling with his children Unni and Maya after getting a transfer from his hometown. The bus meets with an accident and Unni dies at spot. Vishnu's wife Priyamvada is jailed after committing a murder. She kills someone who was molesting Vishnu's sister, Sreekutty.

Vishnu hides the death news of Unni from Priya.Vishnu further tells the villagers that his wife is admitted in the hospital following the accident. In the new place, Vishnu along with his friend Shekharan, Headmaster and others catches Kaatumaakan who with his friends use to steal hens, kill them and make the school untidy and hands him to the police. In the jail, Kaatumakan learns of Priyamvada, who is Vishnu's wife and plans for a revenge.

After some days, Priyamvada is released from the jail. They together hopes for a better life. But Kaatumakan returns and tortures the villagers. On a high windy day, Maya leaves with the neighbours in a horsecart. Priya wanders in search of Maya and gets noticed by Kaatumakan. He tries to hurt Priya, but the high wind makes the school building to collapse and it falls on Kaatumakan, killing him. Vishnu finds frightened Priya in the corner of the school and hugs her. Vishnu, along with other villagers share the happy news of the death of Kaatumaakan.

Cast
 Biju Menon as Vishnu
 Samyuktha Varma as Priyamvadha
 Master Ashwin Thampi as Unni
 Baby Manjima as Maya
 Sreenivasan as Sekharan
 Oduvil Unnikrishnan as Head Master
 Kavya Madhavan as Sunaina
 Sarath Das as Iqbal
 Nedumudi Venu as Bhagavathar
 Mala Aravindan as Abdulla
 Vimal Raj as Kattumakkan
 Augustine as Jail Warden
 Thalaivasal Vijay as Kalki Parameswar
 T. P. Madhavan
 K. P. A. C. Lalitha as Mullathatha
 Sindhu Shyam as Seetha
 Megha as Sreekutty
 Master Vignesh as Hilal

Awards 
 Kerala State Film Award for Second Best Film
 Kerala State Film Award for Best Actress - Samyuktha Varma
 Kerala State Film Award for Best Child Artist -

Soundtrack 
The film's soundtrack contains 6 songs, all composed by Vidyasagar and Lyrics by Yusuf Ali Kecheri.

References

External links
 

2000 films
2000s Malayalam-language films
2000 drama films
Films directed by Kamal (director)
Films scored by Vidyasagar
Indian drama films